GM referred to many of its diesel engines as Ecotec including  the GM Medium Diesel engine (2013 onwards) and the Isuzu-derived Circle L engine. This page describes the SOHC 16 valve turbocharged engines which GM introduced in 1997. and which were used extensively in its European models.

The engines used a single chain-driven camshaft and an aluminium cylinder head with a Bosch rotary high pressure injection pump.

Variants

The 2.0 engine was available in two different power outputs, badged by Vauxhall Di and DTi, the lower powered version retaining 16 valves and a turbocharger, but lacking the intercooler. The lower powered  version was soon replaced by the smaller and unrelated 1.7 litre Circle L engine.

The update also included changes to the camshaft and pistons, and the newer unit was smoother. This update also introduced pilot injection and a variable geometry turbocharger

These engines were replaced by the 1.9 litre GM/Fiat JTD.

Engine Codes
GM referred to these engines using a six-character code, such as Y20DTH. The first letter is X for Euro 2 engines, and Y for those meeting the Euro 3 emissions standard. The two digits are 20 for 2 litres (actually 1,995 cc), and 22 for 2.2 litres (actually 2,171 cc). The next two letters are always DT. The final letter is L if it lacks an intercooler, H if it has an intercooler, and R if it has both an intercooler and a variable geometry turbocharger.

Saab referred to the engine as a D223L, regardless of whether it was a Y22DTH or a Y22DTR.

Applications
 Vauxhall/Opel Astra, fourth generation (2.0 only)
 Vauxhall/Opel Frontera, second generation (2.2 only)
 Vauxhall/Opel Omega B2
 Vauxhall/Opel Signum (until 2005)
 Vauxhall/Opel Sintra (2.2 only, 1999 only)
 Vauxhall/Opel Vectra, series B, and series C until 2004
 Vauxhall/Opel Zafira, series A (2.0 in UK, 2.2 also offered in some markets)
 Saab 9-3, first generation (2.2 only)
 Saab 9-3, second generation (2.2 only, until end 2004)
 Saab 9-5, first generation (2.2 only, 2002 to 2005)

See Also

 Motore Opel Ecotec Serie 20DT (Italian Wikipedia)
 Motore Opel Ecotec Serie 22DT (Italian Wikipedia)

References 

General Motors engines
Diesel engines